Khatgaon is a village in the Karmala taluka of Solapur district in Maharashtra state, India.

Demographics
Covering  and comprising 318 households at the time of the 2011 census of India, Khatgaon had a population of 1457. There were 767 males and 690 females, with 162 people being aged six or younger.

References

Villages in Karmala taluka